The Provisional Government of Bangladesh, popularly known as the Mujibnagar Government, was established following the declaration of independence of East Pakistan as Bangladesh on 10 April 1971. Headed by prime minister Tajuddin Ahmad, it was the supreme leadership of the Bangladeshi liberation movement, comprising a cabinet, a diplomatic corps, an assembly, an armed force, and a radio service.

As after the 1970 general election the military junta of Pakistan denied to hand over power to the elected legislators and Pakistan Army cracked down on the East Pakistani population, the elected political leadership of East Pakistan declared independence and founded the provisional government with the support of the Government of India. Its cabinet took oath on 17 April 1971 in the town of Mujibnagar. The government was headquartered in Kolkata, in exile, the capital of the Indian state of West Bengal. It attracted many defectors from the Pakistani civil and military services and many leading intellectuals and cultural figures from East Pakistan.

The government divided the occupied Bangladesh into administrative zones, with headquarters in India, and appointed elected governors for them. It coordinated with the Government of India in conducting the armed resistance against the Pakistan army and also addressing the refugee crisis. It also undertook an international campaign to garner support for Bangladesh's independence, calling for stopping the genocide and preventing a refugee crisis. It appointed special envoys and operated representative missions in New Delhi, Washington D.C. and London among many other cities.

Background

The 1970 general election, the first of its kind in Pakistan after years of military rule, was held on 7 December 1970. The Awami League, led by Sheikh Mujibur Rahman, secured 160 out of 300 seats, becoming the majority in the National Assembly. With the elections concluded, president Yahya Khan was to inaugurate the National Assembly, and the elected legislators were to draft a new constitution. With the Awami League being in the majority in the assembly, there remained no obstacle to writing a constitution that complied with the six points demand. As a result, anxiety among the West Pakistani opposition parties and the military junta was on the rise.

On 1 March, Yahya Khan postponed the inaugural session of the National Assembly on 3 March, indefinitely. According to him, "it was imperative to give more time to the political leaders to arrive at a reasonable understanding on the issue of Constitution making". Sheikh Mujib immediately called for non-cooperation by his people, effectively taking control of East Pakistan. Mujib kept issuing regular directives to people and party workers. Non-cooperation was an immediate success; people spontaneously defied a curfew imposed by the Army. On 3 March, Yahya Khan announced a round table conference would be held in Dhaka on 10 March to settle the disputes over the constitution. On 7  March 1971, however, in a historical speech in front of a massive gathering, Sheikh Mujib called for an indefinite general strike, asking his people to be prepared for any emergency and issued an ultimatum to the military junta.

On 15 March, Yahya Khan arrived in Dhaka and met Mujib the next day. A series of meetings took place between them until late March. At Yahya's insistence, Zulfikar Ali Bhutto, a West Pakistani opposition party (PPP) leader, joined them from 21 March. Mujib assured Yahya that his party would not harm West Pakistan's interests. During those talks, news of war preparations in East Pakistan were reaching the Awami League leadership. Troops and arms were being concentrated from West Pakistan. Mujib urged Yahya to stop the reinforcements, warning him of the consequences. The Awami League leadership expected that on 24 March final negotiations would take place, however, that day passed with no meeting. On 25 March they learned that Yahya's delegation had secretly left Dhaka, leaving the discussions unfinished, killing any hope for a peaceful settlement.

Sheikh Mujib kept ordering his workers to escape to safety. Mujib refused to escape until 25 March, fearing it would be used as a pretext to massacre innocent Pakistanis. On 25 March, the night Yahya secretly left Dhaka and the Pakistan Army cracked down on the Bangladeshi population there, killing thousands of people. Like the entire nation, the Awami League's leadership was taken by surprise; they scattered, each busy finding their own path to safety, and losing contact with one another for a few days.

It was known days later that Sheikh Mujib had been arrested on the night of 25 March. Before his arrest, he broadcast the independence of Bangladesh in a radio message.

Formation

Following the Pakistan Army crackdown on 25 March night, Awami League leaders Tajuddin Ahmad, general secretary of the party, and Amir-ul Islam escaped Dhaka and crossed the Indian border on 30 March. At the border outpost the regional head of the Indian border security force (BSF), Golok Majumdar received them. Majudmar immediately transported them to Kolkata with him. There, on the night of 30 March and the next day, Tajuddin and Islam had discussions with BSF chief Rustamji, who had come from Delhi after learning of their arrival. On 1 April, Tajuddin and Islam, accompanied by Majumdar, left for Delhi aboard a military cargo plane.

In Delhi, Tajuddin met with India's Prime Minister Indira Gandhi, on 4 April. At their second meeting the following day, Gandhi informed him that Sheikh Mujib had been arrested and transported to Pakistan though Pakistan had not made this official yet. Asked about the Bangladesh government, he replied, having consulted with Amir-ul Islam the day before, that a provisional government had been formed with Sheikh Mujib as its president with the senior Awami League leaders who had attended the Mujib-Yahya talks as cabinet members. Tajuddin presented himself as the prime minister. Except for Sheikh Mujib, the whereabouts of the other members was unknown. Two crucial resolutions were reached in that meeting: India opened its borders to Bangladeshi refugees saving millions of lives in the upcoming days when Pakistani aggression reached outside major cities, and India allowed the Bangladesh Government to operate within Indian territory. The Indian government also promised to help the Bangladeshi liberation war by any means possible.

While Tajuddin was in Delhi, part of the Awami League leadership congregated in Kolkata. Many of them, notably the youth and student leaders, viewed Tajuddin's meeting with the Indian prime minister as an outrageous act sidelining them. On returning to Kolkata, on 8 April, Tajuddin found and met the group of leaders, including A H M Qamaruzzaman, and informed them of the Delhi meeting's outcomes, including the provisional government. Some of the leadership present there questioned Tajuddin's legitimacy as prime minister. The youth leader Sheikh Mani rejected the idea of the cabinet outright. Instead, he proposed setting up a revolutionary council dedicated to conducting armed resistance only. Amir-ul Islam explained the inadequacy of the revolutionary council and the necessity of a legal government. After this, and following Qamaruzzaman's mediation, most of the leadership at the meeting accepted Tajuddin's proposal.

On 10 April, Tajuddin, Amir-ul Islam, Sheikh Mani and others boarded an old Dakota plane borrowed from the Indian government and set off in search of other cabinet members scattered around the borders. Flying at low altitudes, the plane stopped at various airstrips at the borders, most of them built by the British Army during the Second World War. After picking up cabinet members Muhammad Mansur Ali, Abdul Mannan, and Syed Nazrul Islam from various places on the way, on 11 April, the entourage arrived in Agartala, capital of the Indian state of Tripura, where many other Awami League leaders had taken refuge, including Khondaker Mostaq Ahmad and Colonel M A G Osmani.

Reunited in Agartala, the Awami League leadership pondered the cabinet agenda and distributing cabinet offices. In the absence of President Sheikh Mujib, Syed Nazrul Islam served as acting president, Khondaker Mostaq took the Ministry of Foreign Affairs, Qamarauzzaman was given the State Minister's office, Mansur Ali the Finance Minister's, Abdul Mannan took his responsibility as the Minister-In-Charge of Information and Broadcasting Ministry. And Colonel Osmani, a retired veteran of the Pakistan army turned Awami League politician, was appointed commander-in-chief of the armed forces. The entire cabinet returned to Kolkata on 13 April, set to take oath at some yet unoccupied place in Bangladesh.

The oath taking ceremony took place on 17 April 1971, at a village along the India-Bangladesh border, called Baidyanathtala, in Kushtia district (currently Meherpur district), on Bangladeshi soil. The oath taking ceremony was conducted by Abdul Mannan. Professor Yusuf Ali read the proclamation of independence, drafted by Amir-ul Islam, an Awami League MNA-elect and barrister of the Dacca High Court, with the help of Subrata Roy Chowdhury, a barrister of the Calcutta High Court, retroactively in effect from 10 April. Answering a journalist during the ceremony, Tajuddin named the place Mujibnagar, after Sheikh Mujibur Rahman. Later the government-in-exile came to be popularly known as the Mujibnagar Government. Mujibnagar was abandoned quickly after the oath ceremony as participants feared a raid by Pakistani forces. The government settled in Kolkata, in exile, for the rest of the war—briefly at a house on Ballyganj Circular Road and then at 8 Theatre Road.

Constitution

The proclamation of independence issued on 10 April 1971 served as the interim constitution of Bangladesh until 1972 and provided the legal basis of the provisional government. It declared that as Pakistan has failed to convene its elected legislators for framing a new constitution on 3 March 1971 and instead launched an "unjust and treacherous war", Sheikh Mujibur Rahman, had fulfilled aspirations for self-determination by declaring independence of Bangladesh on 26 March 1971:

The proclamation declared formation of a constituent assembly, consisting of the elected legislators, and Bangladesh as a people's republic with "equality, human dignity and social justice" as its fundamental principles:

The government headquarter

According to prime minister Tajuddin's secretary Faruq Aziz Khan:

Structure

Cabinet

Divisions/departments:

 Cabinet Secretariat.
 General Administration Department.
 Relief and Rehabilitation Department.
 Parliamentary Affairs Division.
 Agriculture Department.
 Engineering Department.

Autonomous bodies:

 Planning Commission.
 Board of Trade and Commerce.
 Board of Control, Youth and Reception Camps.
 Relief and Rehabilitation Committee.
 Evacuee Welfare Board.

Parliament
The interim constitution converted Bengali members of Pakistan's national and provincial assemblies elected in the 1970 general election into members of the Constituent Assembly of Bangladesh.

Administration

On 2 June, Bangladesh was divided into five administrative units, called Zonal Administrative Council, governed by elected legislators. On an order (GA/810/345) issued by the prime minister on 27 July the number of zonal councils was increased to 9 and their functions were formalized. On another order (GA/7366/500), issued on 18 September, the number was increased to eleven. The administrative zones were headquartered in Indian territories bordering the zones. The administrative zones were the following:

The following officers were appointed to each zone by the government:

 Zonal Health Officer.
 Zonal Education Officer.
 Zonal Relief Officer.
 Zonal Engineer.
 Zonal Police Officer.
 Zonal Information Officer.
 Zonal Accounts Officer.

Armed forces

Since mid-March, during the Mujib-Yahya talks, Bengali troops were being disarmed and senior Bengali armed forces officers were being transferred on various pretexts. As the war broke out, Bengali soldiers serving in various Pakistani battalions revolted and put up armed resistance against Pakistani forces all over Bangladesh immediately. Rebel commanders of these battalions, mostly junior officers, unaware of the establishment of a provisional government, met along with Colonel M A G Osmani on 4 April. At that meeting, the Bangladesh Forces (BDF, popularly called Mukti Bahini) was formed, with Osmani as its commander-in-chief. A provisional command structure and operation plan was adopted until a government could be formed. Prime minister Tajuddin learned of the Mukti Bahini while he was in Delhi. In his 10 April radio speech he recognized them. Later Lt. Colonel M. A. Rab took over as the Chief of Staff and Group Captain A K Khandker took over as the Deputy Chief of Staff of BDF.

Initially, the Mukti Bahini consisted of the remnants of the five rebel battalions of the East Bengal Regiment (EBR) of the Pakistan Army: 1, 3, and 8 (commanded by Major Ziaur Rahman); 2 (commanded by Major K M Shafiullah); 4 (commanded by Major Khaled Mosharraf). In July, Osmani amalgamated the 3 battalions under Ziaur Rahman's command into a brigade, called 'Z-force'. Similarly, in August–September, two more brigades, 'S-force' and 'K-force', and 3 more battalions for them (9, 10, and 11 EBRs) were raised.

Young people at various locations also put up armed resistance. Unable to overcome the Pakistani forces' onslaught, owing mainly to lack of heavy arms and manpower, both resistances soon retreated into Indian territory. As Pakistani forces spread around the country, thousands of youths from occupied Bangladesh crossed the border into India, seeking arms and training to join the fight against the Pakistani occupation force.

In the mid-July (10 to 15) conference of the BDF sector commanders at the Bangladesh Government's headquarters on Theatre Road in Kolkata, the regular force, comprising the rebel Bengali soldiers from the Pakistan Army and the EPR, was named "Regular Force" (popularly called Mukti Fouj) and the irregular guerrilla warriors were named Gono Bahini (popularly called Muktijoddha or "Freedom Fighter"). The sectors were also reorganized.

The Bangladesh Independence war guerrillas were based in camps on the East Pakistan-India border. On 21 November, it joined Indian forces as part of a combined Bangladesh-Indian allied offensive against Pakistan, which resulted in victory.

Bureaucracy
Many Bengali members of the Civil Service of Pakistan defected to the government of Bangladesh. Dr. Kamal Uddin Siddiqui, Noorul Quader Khan, S. A. Samad, Khondker Asaduzzaman, Dr. Sa'dat Hussain and Dr. Akbar Ali Khan were early leaders of the newly formed Bangladesh Civil Service. Moudud Ahmed served as Postmaster General. The provisional government established an elaborate structure of administrative departments. Yusuf Ali and J. G. Bhowmik served as the chief Relief Commissioners for Bangladeshi refugees. The noted artist Quamrul Hassan served as Director of Art and Design. Calcutta and Agartala were the main centres of the government-in-exile.

Diplomacy

On 15 April, before the Mujibnagar Cabinet took oath, prime minister Tajuddin Ahmad secretly met Hossain Ali, the deputy high commissioner of Pakistan, in Kolkata. Tajuddin persuaded Ali, along with his Bengali staff, to switch allegiance to the Bangladesh government the day after the cabinet took their oaths. As promised, Ali and 70 employees at the Deputy High Commission swore allegiance to the Bangladesh Government, turning the Pakistan High Commission on 9 Circus Avenue into the Bangladesh Mission in Kolkata for good. The mission came to house part of the government's offices, most importantly, the Ministry of Foreign Affairs.

In early April, Tajuddin commissioned economist Rehman Sobhan to stop the economic advisor to Pakistani president Yahya Khan, economist M M Ahmad, from acquiring fresh foreign aid for Pakistan and persuade Bangladeshi officials serving at Pakistani foreign missions to switch allegiance to Bangladesh. In late May, Tajuddin charged journalist Muyeedul Hasan with communicating with the Indian political groups and also establishing liaison with the USSR.

Cultural wing

In May, Swadhin Bangla Betar Kendra, the official radio service of the Government of Bangladesh, began operating with a transmitter allotted by the Indian government. It served as the cultural propaganda wing of the Bangladeshi provisional government.

Conduct of war
Pakistan was helping America in its rapprochement with Communist China. India was a democracy and traditionally non-aligned since the premiership of its first prime minister Jawaharlal Nehru. The quantiplied the Mukti Bahini guerrilla; from 9 May the Indian Army took over from them. 'Youth camps' were set up in border areas to train youths in guerrilla warfare. A large guerrilla force was raised within a few months.

From late June, the first batch of trained Mukti Bahini guerrillas, around two thousand in number, entered and began operating within occupied Bangladesh. Their repeated hit-and-run attacks on Pakistani bases and communication systems caused frustration among the Pakistan Army.

As India signed a friendship treaty with the USSR in August, training and armament of Mukti Bahini grew vigorously. Till then about 10,000 Mukti Bahini guerrillas were trained. It was planned that the number would be increased by 60,000 more, by training 20,000 guerrillas per month. From late August, besides training and supplying the Mukti Bahini, the Eastern Command of the Indian Army, headquartered in Kolkata, got involved in setting their monthly 'ops target'. Major General B N Sarkar of the Indian Army was appointed as the military liaison between the Indian government and the Mujibnagar Government. In a naval operation, Mukti Bahini naval commandos, trained by the Indians, blew up several Pakistani ships anchored at various ports in Bangladesh.

At the beginning of the war, four brigades of the Pakistan Army were stationed in Bangladesh. Indian Army also had a force of similar strength securing its border with Bangladesh. From 25 March to 7 April, Pakistan Army force in Bangladesh was reinforced by two more divisions from Pakistan. For a decisive offensive against the Pakistani forces, Indian force had to be reinforced with forces stationed in its northern front, securing the border with China. Indian military strategists scheduled the decisive offensive in winter, when the mountain passes in its northern front is blocked with ice, thus avoiding a potential Chinese intervention. Meanwhile, Mukti Bahini regular force jointly with the Indian Army would destroy the border outposts, thus making it easier for the guerrillas to pour in and the guerrillas would operate within the country.

Mukti Bahini guerrillas kept attacking government headquarters, military check posts, bridges, railways, and power stations. As a result, land transportation capacity in occupied Bangladesh reduced to one-tenth by September. From the second week of October, guerrilla operation intensified further. Mukti Bahini regular force and Indian Army jointly continued attacking Pakistani border outposts. By late October, only 90 of the 370 outposts survived.

In early December, in the wake of Pakistan's air strike on Indian territory, India declared war with Pakistan and recognized Bangladesh. US president Richard Nixon ordered the Seventh Fleet into the Bay of Bengal. The USSR opposed the move and also deployed its own warships and submarines in the bay. The Pakistani forces surrendered on 16 December in Dhaka.

Issues

In September, 40 members of the national and provincial assemblies of the South Zone, headquartered in Barasat, issued a statement expressing dissatisfaction on the provisional government's performance. They asked for revocation of the prime minister's Zonal Administrative Council order (GA/810/345) and instead forming a committee consisting of Awami League members. They also complained about the members of the Planning Commission as 'none of them is Awami Leaguer nor do they believe in the ideology of Awami League'. They asked for prime minister Tajuddin Ahmad's resignation from the cabinet and Awami League.

The Chhatra League, the student wing of the Awami League, workers united under a separate force, initially called the Bangladesh Liberation Force (BLF) and later Mujib Bahini. Though initially commissioned by Osmani to recruit youths for the regular Bangladesh Forces, they eventually emerged as an independent armed force, under the auspices of the Indian intelligence agency Research and Analysis Wing(RAW). Mujib Bahini clashed with the regular forces at various places. Sector Commanders of the regular forces and Osmani urged the government to bring them under the same command. Prime minister Tajuddin himself expressed his concern about Mujib Bahini to Indian officials on occasion and to Prime Minister Indira Gandhi at their meeting on 22 October. The situation, however, never improved.

By August, Minister of Foreign Affairs Khondaker Mostaq Ahmad and his cohorts at his ministry secretly established a liaison with the United States, a key ally of Pakistan, without the Government's knowledge. With Sheikh Mujib on trial in Pakistan for high treason, the same group was also spreading the 'either freedom or Mujib' doctrine. Indian intelligence agencies had discovered the fact just before Mostaq was scheduled to lead the Bangladesh delegation to the United Nations General Assembly in New York. Tajuddin removed Mostaq from the UN delegation and sacked him later in December, after the war.

See also
 Government in exile
 The Jai Bangla

Notes

References

Sources

External links
 Mujibnagar Government

Bangladesh
Bangladesh Liberation War
Bangladesh Awami League
Provisional governments
Cabinets of Bangladesh
Sheikh Mujibur Rahman ministries